Terry-Mulford House is a historic home located at Orient in Suffolk County, New York. It was built in 1716, with later additions. A side wing was built about 1800 and third wing added in the early 20th century.  Also on the property is a pyramidal-roofed well and small shed.

It was added to the National Register of Historic Places in 1984. The sign is incorrect; it was never a tavern

References

Houses on the National Register of Historic Places in New York (state)
Houses completed in 1800
Houses in Suffolk County, New York
National Register of Historic Places in Suffolk County, New York